Tim Berne (born October 16, 1954) is an American avant-garde jazz saxophonist and record label owner. His primary instruments are the alto and baritone saxophones.

Biography

Berne was born in Syracuse, New York, United States. He has said that he had no interest in playing an instrument until he attended Lewis & Clark College in Oregon. Hearing the album Dogon A.D. (1972) by Julius Hemphill turned his attention toward jazz. He was a fan of rhythm and blues, and it seemed to him that Hemphill was playing jazz with the soulfulness of R&B. In 1974, he went to New York to find Hemphill, who gave him saxophone lessons and advice on how to manage his career. Berne started the record label Empire in 1979.

For Empire, he recorded four albums with avant-garde jazz musicians such as John Carter, Alex Cline, Nels Cline, Olu Dara, Vinny Golia, Paul Motian, and Ed Schuller. His next two albums appeared on Soul Note in the early 1980s. In these sessions he worked with trumpeter Herb Robertson. He then got a contract with Columbia and recorded with Robertson, Hank Roberts, and Bill Frisell. After two albums, he signed with JMT, a label known for avant-garde jazz. In the 1990s, he recorded in the trio, Miniature, with Roberts and Joey Baron, and in the band Caos Totale with Django Bates, Mark Dresser, Marc Ducret, Steve Swell, and Bobby Previte. He led a trio with Michael Formanek and Jim Black, then added Chris Speed for a quartet. PolyGram bought JMT and closed it. This motivated Berne to start Screwgun Records as the outlet for his albums.

He is one-third of the group BBC (Berne/Black/Cline) with Jim Black and Nels Cline of Wilco. The group released a critically acclaimed album called The Veil in 2011.

Groups
 Miniature (Joey Baron, Hank Roberts)
 Caos Totale (Django Bates, Mark Dresser, Marc Ducret, Bobby Previte, Herb Robertson, Steve Swell)
 Bloodcount (Jim Black, Marc Ducret, Michael Formanek, Chris Speed)
 Big Satan (Marc Ducret, Tom Rainey)
 Hard Cell (Tom Rainey, Craig Taborn)
 Science Friction (Marc Ducret, Tom Rainey, Craig Taborn)
 Paraphrase (Drew Gress, Tom Rainey)
 Buffalo Collision (Ethan Iverson,  David King, Hank Roberts)
 BBC Trio (Jim Black, Nels Cline)
 Snakeoil (Marc Ducret,  Matt Mitchell, Oscar Noriega, Ches Smith, formerly Ryan Ferreira)
 Broken Shadows (Reid Anderson, David King, Chris Speed)

Discography

As leader/co-leader
 1979  The Five Year Plan (Empire)
 1980  7X (Empire)
 1981  Spectres (Empire)
 1982  Songs and Rituals in Real Time (Empire)
 1983  The Ancestors (Soul Note)
 1984  Mutant Variations (Soul Note)
 1987  Fulton Street Maul (Columbia)
 1988  Sanctified Dreams (Columbia)
 1989  Tim Berne's Fractured Fairy Tales (JMT)
 1993  Diminutive Mysteries (Mostly Hemphill) (JMT)
 1999  The Empire Box (Screwgun)  CD box set reissue of The Five Year Plan, 7X, Spectres, and Songs and Rituals in Real Time 
 2011  Insomnia (Clean Feed)
 2020  Sacred Vowels (Screwgun)
 2020  Adobe Probe (Screwgun)
 2022  Decay (Screwgun)

with Bill Frisell
 1985  Theoretically (Empire)

with Miniature
 1988  Miniature (JMT)
 1991  I Can't Put My Finger on It (JMT)

with Caos Totale
 1990  Pace Yourself (JMT)
 1994  Nice View (JMT)

with Michael Formanek and Jeff Hirshfield
 1993  Loose Cannon (Soul Note)

with Marilyn Crispell
 1995  Inference (Music & Arts)

with Michael Formanek
 1998  Ornery People (Little Brother)

with Hank Roberts
 1998  Cause & Reflect (Level Green)

with Bloodcount
 1995  Lowlife: The Paris Concert (JMT)
 1995  Poisoned Minds: The Paris Concert (JMT)
 1995  Memory Select: The Paris Concert (JMT)
 1996  Unwound (Screwgun)
 1997  Discretion (Screwgun)
 1997  Saturation Point (Screwgun)
 2007  Seconds (Screwgun)
 2021  Attention Spam (Screwgun)
 2021  5 (Screwgun)

with Paraphrase
 1997  Visitation Rites (Screwgun)
 1999  Please Advise (Screwgun)
 2005  Pre-Emptive Denial (Screwgun)

with Big Satan
 1997  Big Satan (Winter & Winter)
 2004  Souls Saved Hear (Thirsty Ear)
 2006  Livein Cognito (Screwgun)

with Hardcell
 2001  The Shell Game (Thirsty Ear)
 2004  Electric and Acoustic Hard Cell Live (Screwgun)
 2005  Feign (Screwgun)
 2020  The Cosmos (Screwgun)
 2021  Sensitive (Screwgun)

with Herb Robertson, Marc Ducret and the Copenhagen Art Ensemble
 2001  Open, Coma (Screwgun)

with Science Friction
 2002  Science Friction (Screwgun)
 2003  The Sublime And (Thirsty Ear)
 2007  Mind Over Friction (Screwgun)  Box set reissue of Science Friction and The Sublime And 
 2020  Science Friction +size (Screwgun)

with ARTE Quartet
 2002  The Sevens (New World)

with Buffalo Collision
 2008  Duck (Screwgun)

with BB&C
 2011  The Veil (Cryptogramophone)

with Bruno Chevillon
 2011  Old and Unwise (Clean Feed)

with Snakeoil
 2012  Snakeoil (ECM)
 2013  Shadow Man (ECM)
 2015  You've Been Watching Me (ECM)
 2015  Spare (Screwgun)
 2017  Incidentals (ECM)
 2020  The Fantastic Mrs. 10 (Intakt)
 2020  The Deceptive 4 (Intakt)

with Matt Mitchell
 2018  Angel Dusk (Screwgun)
 2020  1 (Screwgun)
 2020  Spiders (Out of Your Head)
 2022  One More, Please (Intakt)

with Broken Shadows
 2019  Broken Shadows (Newvelle, vinyl only; re-released on CD and digital with two additional tracks in 2021 on Intakt)
 2020  Broken Shadows Live (Screwgun)

with Nasheet Waits
 2020  The Coandă Effect (Relative Pitch)
 2022  Tangled (Screwgun)

with Gregg Belisle-Chi
 2022  Mars (Intakt)
 2022  Zone One (Screwgun)

As sideman
With Ray Anderson
Big Band Record (Gramavision, 1994)

With Enten Eller
Melquiades (Splasc(H), 1999)
Auto da Fe (Splasc(H), 2001)

With Umberto Petrin
Ellessi (Splasc(H), 1999)

With Jazzophone Compagnie
Mosaiques (Yolk, 2000)

With Nels Cline
Angelica (Enja, 1988)

With Marc Ducret
Tower Vol. 2 (Ayler, 2011)
Tower Bridge (Ayler, 2014)

With Mr. Rencore
Intollerant (Auand, 2011)

With Simon Fell
Positions & Descriptions (Clean Feed, 2011)

With Figure 8
Pipe Dreams (Black Saint, 1994)

With Michael Formanek
Extended Animation (Enja, 1992)
Low Profile (Enja, 1994)
Nature of the Beast (Enja, 1997)
The Rub and Spare Change (ECM, 2010)
Small Places (ECM, 2012)
The Distance (ECM, 2016)
Even Better (Intakt, 2019)
Pre-Apocalyptic (Out Of Your Head, 2020)

With Vinny Golia
Compositions for Large Ensemble (Nine Winds, 1984)
Facts of Their Own Lives (Nine Winds, 1986)

With Drew Gress
Spin & Drift (Premonition, 2001)
7 Black Butterflies (Premonition, 2005)
The Irrational Numbers (Premonition, 2007)
The Sky Inside (Pirouet, 2013)

With Mark Helias
Split Image (Enja, 1985)
The Current Set (Enja, 1986)

With Julius Hemphill
Five Chord Stud (Black Saint, 1994)
One Atmosphere (Tzadik, 2003)

With Ingrid Laubrock
Ubatuba (2015)

With Ivo Perelman
(D)ivo (2022)

With Hank Roberts
Black Pastels (JMT, 1988)

With Herb Robertson
Transparency (JMT, 1985)
X-Cerpts: Live at Willisau (JMT, 1987)
Elaboration (Clean Feed, 2005)
Real Aberration (Clean Feed, 2007)
With Samo Salamon & Tom Rainey
Duality (Samo Records, 2012)

With George Schuller
Hellbent (Playscape, 2002)

With Ches Smith
Hammered (Clean Feed, 2013)
International Hoohah (For Tune, 2014)

With Spring Heel Jack
Masses (Thirsty Ear, 2001)

With David Torn
Prezens (ECM, 2005)
Slipped On A Bar (Screwgun, 2009)
Son Of Goldfinger (ECM, 2019)
Son Of Goldfinger (Congratulations To You) (Screwgun, 2020)
xFORM (Screwgun, 2020)
Ozmir (Screwgun, 2022)

With Stefan Winter
The Little Trumpet (JMT, 1986)

With Yōsuke Yamashita
Ways of Time (Verve, 1995)

With John Zorn
The Big Gundown (Nonesuch/Icon, 1986)
Spy vs Spy (Elektra/Musician, 1989)

References

External links
    
 Official website, Screwgun Records
 A 1998 interview
 "A Fireside Chat with Tim Berne" at Jazz Weekly
 Interview at Ethan Iverson's site
 Discography

American jazz saxophonists
American male saxophonists
Avant-garde jazz saxophonists
Free jazz saxophonists
1954 births
Living people
Place of birth missing (living people)
21st-century American saxophonists
21st-century American male musicians
American male jazz musicians
Big Satan members
Clean Feed Records artists
Thirsty Ear Recordings artists
ECM Records artists
Black Saint/Soul Note artists
Columbia Records artists
Intakt Records artists